Paper Mill Playhouse is a regional theater with approximately 1200 seats, located in Millburn, New Jersey on the Rahway River. Due to its relatively close location to Manhattan, it draws from the pool of actors (and audience members) who live in New York City. Paper Mill was officially designated as the "State Theater of New Jersey". From 1971 to 2008, Paper Mill held the New Jersey Ballet as its resident ballet company, with the annual production of Nutcracker until the premiere 25th Anniversary tour of Les Misérables took up the ballet's performance slot. Mark S. Hoebee serves as the producing artistic director, and is often credited as saving the Paper Mill during the financial crisis in 2008.

In 2016, the playhouse received the Regional Theatre Tony Award.

History

Building
In March 1795, Sam Campbell built The Thistle Paper Mill on land along the Rahway River in the town of Millville, later renamed Millburn. Campbell ran his business for about 20 years until he was forced to close down due to a fire. The building remained vacant for several years and ownership changed several times. In the late 1870s, Diamond Mill Paper Company took over the property and used it for their paper making business until 1928.

Writer and performer Antoinette Scudder, along with actor and director Frank Carrington formed a partnership in the late 1920s to create their own theater. The eventually found the vacant mill, and spent many years working on it, turning it into a theater.

Another fire in 1980 changed the course of the theater, and it closed for rebuilding. On October 30, 1982, the Paper Mill reopened for their first theatrical production since the fire. This period of time became the focal point of a lawsuit between the theater and Millburn on whether or not they would be exempt from property taxes during the time the property was not in use.

Theater
Founded in 1934, Paper Mill Playhouse raised the curtain on its first performance with Gregorio Martinez Sierra’s The Kingdom of God on November 14, 1938. By the end of the first year, Carrington had coaxed entertainer Irene Castle out of retirement to make her dramatic debut in Noël Coward’s Shadow Play. The first few years featured a variety of classical and modern plays. By 1941, the Playhouse had begun to specialize in operettas, which it continued until the early 1950s.

Change marked this period in Paper Mill’s history, especially with Miss Scudder’s death in 1958. Angelo Del Rossi joined as associate producer in 1964, working closely with Carrington until his death in 1975. Del Rossi became executive producer and remained in that role for nearly 40 years until his death in August 2014.

In 1971, the New Jersey Ballet staged its first production of The Nutcracker at Paper Mill with world-renowned dancer Edward Villella in the role of the Cavalier. The Nutcracker production has been produced annually at Paper Mill since then.

In 1972, Governor of New Jersey William Cahill proclaimed Paper Mill the "Official State Theater of New Jersey." The theater has been cited as a State Center of Artistic Excellence and as a Major Impact and Distinguished Arts Organization by the New Jersey State Council on the Arts.

Through the years, Paper Mill Playhouse has welcomed such talent as Christopher Patterson, Gloria Stuart, Alice Ripley, Eddie Bracken, Laura Benanti (Rising Star Award winner), Orson Bean, Betty Buckley, Carol Channing, Kristin Chenoweth, Christine Ebersole, George S. Irving, Tiffany Giardina, Laurence Guittard, Anne Hathaway (Paper Mill Conservatory alumna and Rising Star Award nominee), Shanice Williams (Paper Mill Conservatory alumna, Rising Star Award nominee, and Adopt-A-School participant), Dee Hoty, John Mahoney, Dorothy Louden, Donna McKechnie, Ann Miller, Stephanie Mills, Liza Minnelli, Estelle Parsons, Bernadette Peters, Chita Rivera, Tony Roberts, Ali Brustofski, Patrick Swayze, Karen Ziemba, Adrian Zmed, Nick Jonas (actor, singer and member of the band the Jonas Brothers), Bailey Hanks (the winner of Legally Blonde: The Musical – The Search for Elle Woods), Lynn Redgrave, Lorna Luft, David Garrison, Douglas Fairbanks Jr., Mickey Rooney, Barbara Rush, Betsy Palmer, Robert Horton, Vivian Vance, Jerome Hines, Sarah Hyland, Shelley Winters, Hugh O'Brian, Gloria Swanson, Georgia Engel, and Gavin Lee among many.

In April 2003, Michael Gennaro, former executive director of Chicago's Steppenwolf Theater, joined Paper Mill as president and CEO. Paper Mill Playhouse was one of the first theaters to begin the regional theater movement in the United States. It has grown to be one of the most acclaimed not-for-profit professional theaters in the country, and attracts more than 450,000 people annually, and has one of the largest subscription based audiences.

Financial issues
On April 3, 2007, Paper Mill announced that it would need $1.5 million to open its season and an equal amount to complete its season, or it would be forced to close its doors. On April 6, 2007, Paper Mill announced that it had received $300,000, enough to cover costs of rehearsals and preview performances for its production of Seven Brides for Seven Brothers.

Paper Mill announced that it would have to do more well-known shows to stay in business. On June 17, 2008, the Township of Millburn voted to purchase building and four acres of land the Paper Mill sits on for $9 million. They have entered into a 75-year lease with the theater; and its operations will remain independent. Prior to this deal the Paper Mill had accumulated $4.5 million in debt. Based on the terms of the lease, the Paper Mill would pay $1 for the first two years. After 2 years the rent would grow to equal 1% of the theater's annual operation income. The Paper Mill maintained an option to repurchase the property from the town after 11 years of the lease. The artistic director at the time, Mark S. Hoebee, is attributed with saving the Paper Mill.

Seasons

Affiliations

Paper Mill is a member of the Council of Stock Theatres (COST), a group of theaters who join to negotiate with the various unions that are involved in stage productions. COST's contract with Actors' Equity allows for a minimum weekly salary which is smaller than what Broadway productions must pay their actors; Paper Mill is also allowed to cast a minimal amount of non-union actors, which is forbidden for Broadway shows. This gives Paper Mill the ability to produce shows on a larger scale than most Broadway productions (and in a shorter amount of time).

Educational programs

Paper Mill also has a large theater school offering a variety of classes. They have also run classes for developmentally disabled students with VSA New Jersey.

Starting in 1996, the Paper Mill holds annual Rising Star Awards (modeled after the Tony Awards) every spring, honoring excellence in high school theater performances across the state of New Jersey. Students who are nominated in lead and supporting acting categories receive scholarships to Paper Mill's Summer Musical Theater Conservatory and may perform in their annual finale concert. Former Conservatory attendees include Anne Hathaway, Julia Knitel, and Rob McClure.

References

External links

Paper Mill Playhouse's Official Website

Millburn, New Jersey
Theatres in New Jersey
Buildings and structures in Essex County, New Jersey
Tourist attractions in Essex County, New Jersey